Goran Nikić (born 1969) is a Serbian former professional footballer who played as a midfielder.

At international level, Nikić represented FR Yugoslavia U-21 in one U-21 Euro and was on the preliminary squad for the 1987 FIFA World Youth Championship winning team.

Club career
Born in Belgrade, Nikić made his senior debut with Red Star Belgrade. After suffering a hamstring injury, he left for various clubs before eventually retiring in 2000.

International career
Nikić represented Yugoslavia at the U-21 level in the 1986 European Championship. He was also in the preliminary squad for the 1987 Youth World Cup in Chile, but was sidelined due to an injury and could not play. The team eventually won the World Cup.

Post-playing career
Nikić coached Kolubara, Sopot, Budućnost, Dinamo and Jedinstvo, and then he got his chance to return to Red Star as a coach in the youth academy.

Personal life
Nikić's daughter is a Serbian handball player.

References

Association football midfielders
Red Star Belgrade footballers
FK Rad players
Serbian footballers
Footballers from Belgrade
Yugoslav First League players
Yugoslav footballers
Yugoslavia under-21 international footballers
1969 births
Living people